Frida Aasen (born 5 December 1994) is a Norwegian fashion model best known for walking in the Victoria's Secret Fashion Show in 2017 and 2018.

Early life
She has won several ribbons in horseback riding competitions.

Donna Ioanna, a model agent, discovered her while she was shopping at a mall.

Career
In 2012, she was featured on the first edition of Carine Roitfeld's magazine CR Fashion Book.

In 2013, she was referred to as a face to watch by Vogue, alongside Martha Hunt and Kelly Gale.

She has appeared in adverts and catalogues for Tory Burch, Victoria's Secret, H&M, Nasty Gal, Dsquared² and Saks Fifth Avenue. She walked the runways of Prada, Loewe, Louis Vuitton, Fendi, Blumarine, Just Cavalli, Salvatore Ferragamo, DKNY, Derek Lam, Carolina Herrera, Anna Sui, Cushnie et Ochs, Tory Burch and Jeremy Scott.

She has been featured on the cover of fashion magazines, including Dazed and Confused, Elle and Madame Figaro, as well as editorials for Numéro, Vogue.com, V, LOVE, Marie Claire, CR Fashion Book, Exit, 10 Magazine and Russh.

She often poses for Victoria's Secret, and has walked for the Victoria's Secret Fashion Show in both 2017 and 2018.

Personal life 
Aasen became engaged to Italian businessman, Tommy Chiabra, in August 2021, and married on July 14, 2022.

References

External links

Living people
1994 births
Norwegian female models
People from Kristiansand
The Lions (agency) models